Yorkville is an unincorporated community in Mendocino County, California.

The Yorkville post office opened in 1868 and moved to the new site with the town in 1937. "The Late Pomo or Ma-cu-maks of the present day Yorkville area spoke the central Pomo language."

The name honors R.H. York, the town's founder.

The Yorkville Highlands AVA was established in 1998. The Galbreath Wildlands Preserve, which is owned and managed by Sonoma State University as an educational site, is located nearby.

See also 
 Yorkville Highlands AVA

References

Unincorporated communities in California
Unincorporated communities in Mendocino County, California